Marc John Collins-Rector (born October 16, 1959) is an American businessman, convicted sex offender, known for founding Digital Entertainment Network, an online streaming video broadcaster and notable dot-com failure, as well as his associations with Hollywood and media figures. His child sexual abuse conviction is highlighted in the 2014 documentary An Open Secret.

Early life 
Collins-Rector was born Mark John Rector. He changed his name to Marc Collins-Rector in 1998.

In the early 1980s, Rector founded Telequest, a Florida-based telecommunications company. In 1984, he founded World TravelNet, a company which electronically coordinated cruises and tours; its affiliate, World ComNet, was floated on the Vancouver Stock Exchange in 1987. Its valuation briefly peaked at $100 million before increasing competition led to bankruptcy. Rector later founded an early ISP; Concentric Network, in 1991 along with partner Chad Shackley.

DEN founding 

Rector and Shackley sold Concentric in 1995 and, using money raised from the sale, as well as close to $100million of investor and venture capital, formed an early Internet video media content delivery company, Digital Entertainment Network. Collins-Rector was the co-founder and chairman of DEN, which exhausted its funding following a failed IPO bid and collapsed amidst allegations of Collins-Rector having sexually abused boys, coercing them with drugs and guns.

Child enticement conviction 

Collins-Rector and his business partners, Chad Shackley and Brock Pierce, operated DEN out of a Los Angeles mansion. There, they held parties attended by Hollywood's gay A-list. At those parties, Collins-Rector and others were alleged to have engaged in sexual assaults against teenaged boys.

In August 2000, a New Jersey federal grand jury indicted Collins-Rector on criminal charges that he had transported minors across state lines for the purpose of having sex with them. After his indictment, Collins-Rector fled to Spain together with Shackley and Pierce. Interpol arrested the three men on May 17, 2002, in a house in the Spanish city of Marbella. Shackley and Pierce were released without being criminally charged. Guns, machetes and child pornography were found in the house.

Collins-Rector fought extradition proceedings for two years before returning to the United States, where he pleaded guilty to eight charges of child enticement and registered as a sex offender. He admitted luring five minors across state lines for sexual purposes. He received credit for time that he had served in a Spanish jail and was registered as a sex offender under a weekly supervision.

In 2006, a U.S. District Court granted Collins-Rector special permission to go to the United Kingdom to receive treatment for a brain tumor. He subsequently renounced his US citizenship and has never returned to the United States. In 2007, he was photographed in London, and in 2008 was living in the Dominican Republic. , he lives in a "European port city" and uses the names "Mark Collins" and "Morgan Von Phoenix".

Later career 
News reports have stated that Collins-Rector was a silent partner in the MMORPG service company IGE, which was founded by ex-DEN VP Brock Pierce - who was chairman of the Bitcoin Foundation. IGE initially used an address in the city of Marbella, Spain, where Collins-Rector, Shackley and Pierce shared a villa until it was raided by Interpol in 2002.

References

1959 births
American media executives
American telecommunications industry businesspeople
Businesspeople from Florida
Fugitives wanted by the United States
Fugitives wanted on sex crime charges
American LGBT businesspeople
Living people
Gay men
People extradited from Spain
People extradited to the United States
People who renounced United States citizenship
Place of birth missing (living people)
Violence against men in North America